Page program may refer to:

 United States House of Representatives Page
 United States Senate Page
 Canadian House of Commons Page Program
 Canadian Senate Page Program